Ghiroda (as opposed to Neugiroda, now a district of Timișoara) is a commune in Timiș County, Romania. It is composed of two villages, Ghiroda (commune seat) and Giarmata-Vii. It is located near Timișoara, to the east. As a result of the development of the city, the commune shows characteristics of being a suburb of Timișoara.

Location 
Ghiroda is located in the center of Timiș County, a few kilometers northeast of Timișoara, with which it borders. In practice, Ghiroda is attached to Timișoara. It is bounded to the south by the Bega Canal. To the west, it connects to Timișoara through two streets that continue in the urban fabric of the municipality.

History 
The oldest traces of habitation discovered on the current administrative territory of Ghiroda date from the Eneolithic. In 2015, a site was discovered in the vicinity of the Timișoara–Lugoj railway, on a 90-meter-high terrace. Here were highlighted fragments of pottery attributed to the Gornești–Bodrogkeresztúr culture, which attest to an important habitation, in a settlement probably arranged on an island surrounded by water. Recent research has also shown traces of habitation from other eras: the Bronze Age, Roman Dacia (2nd–3rd centuries AD) and, especially, the Middle Ages, when the habitation of this area became uninterrupted to this day.

The first recorded mention of Ghiroda dates from 1332. In 1393 it appears mentioned in a document with the name villa Gyrod, which shows that it was of high importance. Between Ghiroda and Remetea Mare existed in the Middle Ages and at the beginning of the Habsburg period the village of Deg, now extinct. At the 1717 census, it appears with 24 houses and the name Girouda. Count Mercy brought German settlers here, and the village became Romanian-German. Later, Count Perlas tried to introduce rice culture to Ghiroda, but was unsuccessful due to the unclayey soil. It belonged to the Aerarium until 1781, when it was bought by Mihály Sándor, and until 1896 it had several private owners. Hungarian colonists settled in the 19th century and the hearth of the village expanded substantially. In 1931, Ghiroda was a commune and included the Romanian villages of Crișan and Sever Bocu; later, they became part of the hearth of the locality.

The history of Giarmata-Vii is closely related to the neighboring locality Giarmata, to which it belonged and whose inhabitants contributed to the establishment of the new settlement. It is a new locality, as it appears only at the beginning of the 19th century. The Timișoara administration owned several uncultivated lands in the vicinity of the city, which it decided to put up for sale. The land was bought by the inhabitants of the neighboring villages, who became the first inhabitants of Überland. This word of German origin is found in several Banat villages and designates an "overland". In the case of Giarmata-Vii, the term became the proper name of the locality. Under the name of Giarmata-Vii it appears only in 1943. In the beginning, the main occupation of the newly established was viticulture. An important moment for the history of Giarmata-Vii is the year 1948, when its inhabitants submitted to the Timiș-Torontal County Prefecture a memorandum requesting the detachment of the village from the commune of Giarmata and the establishment of a new commune. The memorandum was approved by the first praetor of Plasa Timișoara, Mihai Grivei, who decided to establish a rural commune called Viișoara. The Giarmata mayor's office accepted the decision to detach Giarmata-Vii from Giarmata on 21 February 1948. However, the proceedings did not continue, as the decision was met by the refusal of the Ministry of Internal Affairs. Starting with 1956, Giarmata-Vii is attached to the commune of Ghiroda.

Demographics 

Ghiroda had a population of 6,200 inhabitants at the 2011 census, up 26% from the 2002 census. Most inhabitants are Romanians (89.76%), with a minority of Hungarians (4.11%). For 3.84% of the population, ethnicity is unknown. By religion, most inhabitants are Orthodox (78.76%), but there are also minorities of Pentecostals (7.32%), Roman Catholics (5.69%) and Baptists (1.6%). For 4.39% of the population, religious affiliation is unknown.

Notes

References 

Communes in Timiș County
Localities in Romanian Banat